Metius constrictus is a species of ground beetle in the subfamily Pterostichinae. It was described by Straneo in 1951.

References

Metius (genus)
Beetles described in 1951